Tin Hats is a 1926 American silent comedy film directed by Edward Sedgwick (his first for MGM), starring Claire Windsor and Conrad Nagel. The film is considered partially lost.

Plot
Three United States soldiers (Conrad Nagel, George Cooper and Tom O'Brien) are lost in the Rhineland on Armistice Day and accepted as conquering overlords by a village... except for Lady Bountiful (Claire Windsor).

Cast
 Conrad Nagel as Jack Benson 
 Claire Windsor as Elsa von Bergen 
 George Cooper as 'Lefty' Mooney 
 Bert Roach as 'Dutch' Krausmeyer 
 Tom O'Brien as Sergeant McGurk 
 Eileen Sedgwick as Freida

References

External links

1926 films
Metro-Goldwyn-Mayer films
American silent feature films
American black-and-white films
Silent American comedy films
Western Front (World War I) films
Films set in Germany
Films directed by Edward Sedgwick
1926 comedy films
1920s American films